Chetak may refer to:

 Chetak (died 1576), the horse of Maharana Pratap
 Chetak Circle, a shopping area in Udaipur, Rajasthan, India
 Chetak Express, train that runs between Udaipur City and Delhi Sarai Rohilla, India
 Chetak Smarak, a memorial for the horse Chetak in Rajsamand District, Rajasthan, India
 Bajaj Chetak, an Indian-made motor scooter
 HAL Chetak, an Indian version of the Aérospatiale Alouette III helicopter
Chetak, 1960 Indian film written and directed by Kidar Sharma
 Chetak, 1993 animated short film in the 41st National Film Awards in India
 Chetak and Nav Chetak, specially named locomotives of India
 Chetak Corps, nickname for the Indian Army's X Corps
 Chetak Rana Pratap, 1958 film featuring Mubarak Begum as playback singer
 Chetak (rocket), a two-stage-to-orbit small-lift launch vehicle developed by Bellatrix Aerospace

See also
 Chetaka, king of Vaishali (India) in the 5th century BC